Xyloryctes is a genus of rhinoceros beetles in the family Scarabaeidae. There are about 13 described species in Xyloryctes.

Species
These 13 species belong to the genus Xyloryctes:

 Xyloryctes corniger Bates, 1888
 Xyloryctes ensifer Bates, 1888
 Xyloryctes faunus Casey, 1895
 Xyloryctes furcatus Burmeister, 1847
 Xyloryctes guatemalensis Bitar & Delgado, 2009
 Xyloryctes howdenorum Delgado & Najera, 1992
 Xyloryctes jamaicensis (Drury, 1773) (rhinoceros beetle)
 Xyloryctes lobicollis Bates, 1888
 Xyloryctes orientalis Bitar & Morón, 2014
 Xyloryctes splendidus Prell, 1914
 Xyloryctes telephus Burmeister, 1847
 Xyloryctes teuthras Bates, 1888
 Xyloryctes thestalus BATES, 1888

References

Further reading

External links

 

Dynastinae
Articles created by Qbugbot